Félix Kouadjo (1939 – May 6, 2012) was the Roman Catholic bishop of the Roman Catholic Diocese of Bondoukou, Côte d'Ivoire.

He was born in the village of Binao in 1939. Ordained to the priesthood in 1969, Kouadjo became a bishop in 1996. He died at the Bondoukou Regional Hospital from cardiac issues while in office.

Notes

21st-century Roman Catholic bishops in Ivory Coast
1939 births
2012 deaths
Date of birth missing
20th-century Roman Catholic bishops in Ivory Coast
People from Lagunes District
Roman Catholic bishops of Bondoukou